Cruttenden is a surname. Notable people with the surname include:
 Abigail Cruttenden (born 1968), English actress
 Hal Cruttenden  (born 1969), English stand-up comedian, writer and actor
 Robert Cruttenden (1690–1763), London merchant, Methodist and hymn-writer
 Roger Cruttenden (born 1944), English cricketer
 Roy Cruttenden (born 1925), British long jumper
 David Cruttenden (born 1977), English Singer-Songwriter-Musician, better known by his stage name Nice Guy Dave.

See also
 Arthur Cruttenden Mace (1874–1928), English Egyptologist
 Timothy Lawson-Cruttenden (born 1955), British lawyer